The 2017–18 Tennessee Lady Volunteers basketball team represented the University of Tennessee in the 2017–18 college basketball season. The Lady Vols, led by sixth-year head coach Holly Warlick, played their games at Thompson–Boling Arena and are members of the Southeastern Conference.

In the November 24 Cancún Challenge game against Oklahoma State, Jaime Nared scored her 1,000th point. She is the 45th Lady Vol to do so in her career.

The Lady Vols finished the season 25–8, 11–5 for a third-place tie in SEC play. They lost in the second round of the SEC tournament to South Carolina. Nationally ranked twelfth at the end of the season, they received an at-large bid to the NCAA tournament where they defeated Liberty in the first round before losing to Oregon State in the second round.

Previous season
The 2016–17 team finished the season 20–12, 10–6 for fifth place in SEC play. They lost in the second round of the 2017 SEC tournament to Alabama. They received an at-large bid to the 2017 NCAA women's tournament where they defeated Dayton in the first round before losing to Louisville in the second round.

Roster

Rankings

^Coaches' Poll did not release a second poll at the same time as the AP.

Schedule and results

|-
!colspan=9 style=""| Exhibition

|-
!colspan=9 style=""| Regular season

|-
!colspan=9 style=""| SEC women's tournament

|-
!colspan=9 style=""| NCAA women's tournament

Source:

See also
 2017–18 Tennessee Volunteers basketball team

References

Tennessee
Tennessee Lady Volunteers basketball seasons
Volunteers
Volunteers
Tennessee